Costa Del Sol Nairi's was a Belizean football team that formerly competed in the Belize Premier Football League (BPFL) of the Football Federation of Belize.

The team was based in San Pedro Town. Their home stadium was Ambergris Stadium.

Football clubs in Belize
2006 establishments in Belize
Association football clubs established in 2006